The archery competitions at the 2007 Pan American Games were held on the Deodoro Military Club from July 24 to July 28, 2007.

Athletes
64 athletes, 32 men and 32 women, from 14 countries will be competing for the 12 medals to be awarded.

Competition
After the first elimination rounds, Women's and Men's groups were set as follows.

Women's individual eliminations: Group 1

Women's individual eliminations: Group 2

Women's individual finals

Men's individual eliminations: Group 1

Men's individual eliminations: Group 2

Men's individual finals

Men's teams

Women's teams

Men's events

Women's events

Medal table

See also
Archery at the 2008 Summer Olympics

External links
2007 Panamerican Games Official Archery page.
International Archery Federation IAF.

P
2007
Events at the 2007 Pan American Games